Port Graham, also known as Paluwik (pah-LU-wig) in the Alutiiq language, is a census-designated place (CDP) in Kenai Peninsula Borough, Alaska, United States. At the 2020 census, the population was 162.

Geography

Although they have local roads, there is no road access into this area. All vehicles must be brought in by barge or ferry. Both villages are accessible by air or water. The Alaska Marine Highway System provides ferry service to all of Kachemak Bay, the water body separating Port Graham, Nanwalek and Seldovia from Homer.

Port Graham is located at  (59.347736, -151.833420).

Demographics

Port Graham first appeared on the 1920 U.S. Census as an unincorporated village. It did not appear on the 1930 census, but returned in 1940 and in every subsequent census. It was made a census-designated place (CDP) in 1980.

As of the census of 2000, there were 171 people, 70 households, and 46 families residing in the CDP. There were 82 housing units at an average density of 13.8/sq mi (5.3/km2). The racial makeup of the CDP was 11.11% White, 84.80% Native American, 0.58% from other races, and 3.51% from two or more races. 3.51% of the population were Hispanic or Latino of any race.

There were 70 households, out of which 35.7% had children under the age of 18 living with them, 38.6% were married couples living together, 17.1% had a female householder with no husband present, and 32.9% were non-families. 28.6% of all households were made up of individuals, and 2.9% had someone living alone who was 65 years of age or older. The average household size was 2.44 and the average family size was 2.98.

In the CDP, the population was spread out, with 30.4% under the age of 18, 4.1% from 18 to 24, 29.8% from 25 to 44, 25.1% from 45 to 64, and 10.5% who were 65 years of age or older. The median age was 38 years. For every 100 females, there were 113.8 males. For every 100 females age 18 and over, there were 108.8 males.

The median income for a household in the CDP was $40,250, and the median income for a family was $43,438. Males had a median income of $36,250 versus $14,250 for females. The per capita income for the CDP was $13,666. About 15.1% of families and 18.8% of the population were below the poverty line, including 25.9% of those under the age of eighteen and 11.1% of those 65 or over.

References

Census-designated places in Alaska
Census-designated places in Kenai Peninsula Borough, Alaska
Populated coastal places in Alaska on the Pacific Ocean
Road-inaccessible communities of Alaska